Gawharshad University (GU) is an institution of higher education in Kabul, Afghanistan.

History
People and government of Afghanistan, after overthrow of the Taliban regime in 2001, started reconstruction and rebuilding in different aspects including higher education section. According to the policy of present government, private sectors are allowed to participate in different section including the higher education, in this context more than 80 private universities are active in Kabul and many other provinces such as Mazar-e- Sharif, Herat, Jalabad, Qandahar, Ghazni etc. Gawharshad University is the most successful and well known one, and its activities are under the Afghan Ministry of Higher Education.
GU was established as a small non-profit private University in 2010 by Dr.Sima Samar; the current head of Afghanistan Independent Human Rights Commission (AIHRC). The vision of this institute was to provide quality education to the down-trodden and the underprivileged segments of society. Therefore, GU started its journey in providing quality higher education at a very affordable rate. It started giving a special discount to all female students. The vision seemed adventurous given the difficult situation in the country and very meager resources. However, now after four years of continued institutional survival and the demonstration of expansion and growth, it has been obvious that GU has well started moving forward towards a successful future of further striving for progressive social development.

Board of trustees
 Dr. Sima Samar, former vice president and former Minister of Women Affairs and the current head of Afghanistan Independent Human Rights Commission (AIHRC)
 Dr. Ashraf Ghani Ahmadzai, the former Finance Minister, and the current President of Afghanistan
 Dr. Dadfar Spanta, the former Foreign Affairs Minister, and the present Head of National Security Council
 Dr. Azam Dadfar,  the former Ministry of Higher Education
 Dr. Ehsan Zia,  the former Rural Rehabilitation and development Minister
 Dr. Zaher Fahimi, the current professor of Shahed Rabeni (Education Pedagogy) University
 Professor Hamid Layan
 Professor Azam Banwal
 Dr. Alama
 Dr. Mohammad Ibrahim Atmer a bussnissman in Afghanistan.

Faculties
GU has four faculties: first one is Faculty of Law and Political science, which combined from two separate departments; Law and political science, and the second is faculty of Economic management that also has two departments; department BA and Economics management. Third one is Civil Eng. and the forth one is Computer Science which combined of two departments of Information Technology and Software Eng..More than 1600 students are studying in Gawharshad and nearly 35% of them are women. All courses in Gawharshad are offered in two times; morning and evening. According to the rules of Higher Education Ministry, every student can choose between 17 credits and 21 credits in every term. According to this program, the total time needed for graduation is about four years. Gawharshad has planned to develop the faculties and departments.

Instructors and curriculum
All lecturers who are teaching in GU are experienced instructors; they have obtained their master's or doctorates from the US, Europe, South and Central Asia, and the Middle East countries. Almost 100 lecturers are working with GU, including almost 25 full-time and 75 part-time lecturers. Gawharshad has an international credit-based educational standards and curriculum. GU has a platform which works on curriculum towards the country's needs and is based on international standards.

Women empowerment center
As a non-profit university with a social advancement focus, one of the most important goals of its establishment was providing a good condition for women and girls, particularly those who are unable to pay their education fees, but they are interested in higher education. In order to obtain this goal, Gawharshad has founded a special center called women empowerment center. This center has made a good communications with many internal and external donors to receive funds and support poor and motivated women. Up to now more than 100 women have received scholarships.

Research Unit
GU has provided a unit for development researches methods on different issues. This unit has plans to conduct some researches particularly for preparing the university's textbooks. In addition this unit has provided for debate and dialogues by organizing regular seminars, public lectures and conferences.

References

Universities and colleges in Kabul
Private universities in Afghanistan
2010 establishments in Afghanistan
Educational institutions established in 2010